Strumaria spiralis is a species of flowering plant belonging to the family Amaryllidaceae.

Its native range is South Africa.

References

spiralis
Flora of the Cape Provinces